The Blackest Box is a compilation boxset by Danish punk/rock band Sort Sol/Sods. The boxset comprises 11 CDs – eight CDs with remastered editions of all of the band's studio albums, as well as three bonus CD (including the new songs from the 2002 compilation album Circle Hits the Flame – Best Off...). The boxset includes a new version of the album Unspoiled Monsters. In the boxset the album is named: Unspoiled Monsters / Artist's Cut. The difference from the original release and the version in the boxset is both the order of the tracks on the album and the lack of the song called: "The Painter" from the original release.

Reception

This boxset was received with mixed reviews, while most acknowledge the significance of boxset summarizing the entire career of one of Denmarks punk/rock bands, some lament the lack of a written booklet.

Track listing
For track listings of individual studio albums, see their respective pages.

 Minutes To Go 1979 track listing, using songs remastered in 1997.
 Under en sort sol 1980 track listing, using songs remastered in 1997.
 Dagger & Guitar 1983 track listing, using songs remastered in 1997.
 Everything That Rises Must Converge 1987 track listing, using songs remastered in 1997.
 Flow My Firetear
 Glamourpuss
 Unspoiled Monsters
 Snakecharmer

Personnel

Sods/Sort Sol
 Steen Jørgensen – vocals, pocket trumpet
 Knud Odde – bass
 Tomas Ortved – drums
 Peter Peter – guitar
 Lars Top-Galia – guitar

Additional musicians and production
 Lars Top-Galia – Compilation of Stamina bonus albums
 Jan Eliasson – Mastering of Stamina bonus albums
"Stamina 1"
 Morten Versner – violin on "Il Zone"
"Stamina 2"
 Flemming Nygaard Madsen – cello on "A Knife For The Ladies", "Shapes Of Summer" and "Midget Finger"
 Elisabeth – backing vocals on "A Knife For The Ladies"
 Povl Kristian – organ on "Angelus Novus"
 Wili Jønsson – bass, backing vocals on "Love Is All Around"
 Kjeld Tolstrup – drumtrack on "Love Is All Around"
 Torsten "Metalstein" Hvas – handclaps on "A Knife For The Ladies"
 Mette Shannon – farfisa on "As She Weeps", saxophone, horns on "Children Of The Revolution"
 Karin Ørum – backing vocals on "Children Of The Revolution"
"Stamina 3"
 Wili Jønsson – on "Circle Hits The Flame", "Restless Yellow Night" and "Maria Interlude"
 Wagner/Stage – on "Circle Hits The Flame"
 Charlotte Guillemard – on "Circle Hits The Flame"
 Chapman/Wallis – on "Golden Wonder"
 Peter Schneidermann – "Sugar & Wine"
 The Jordanaries – "Sugar & Wine"
 Maria Rich – "Restless Yellow Night"
 Henrik Liebgott – "Angel Of Death (Gletcher Man)" and "Waah"
 Louisiana Museum Art Ensemble featuring Anton Kontra – "To Die: To Sleep"

References

Sort Sol albums
2011 compilation albums